Victoria Christina Niarchos (born 30 January 1960) is a member of the banking branch of the Guinness beer clan.

She is a daughter of Patrick Benjamin Guinness (1931–1965) (himself half-brother of the Aga Khan IV) and his wife (and stepsister), the former Dolores Guinness (1936–2012) (Dolores Maria Agatha Wilhelmine Luise, Freiin von Fürstenberg-Hedringen), herself the daughter of the Mexican socialite Gloria Guinness (1912–1980) and Count Franz-Egon von Fürstenberg-Herdringen (1896–1975). She has two older siblings: Countess Maria Alexandra de Quatrebarbes (b. 1956) and Loel Patrick Guinness (b. 1957).

The third and former wife of Greek shipping heir Philip Niarchos (b. 1954), she is the mother of: 
 Stavros Niarchos III (b. 17 April 1985) 
 Eugenie Niarchos (b. 15 July 1986), also sometimes referred to as Eugenia
 Theodorakis Niarchos (b. 3 April 1991)
 Electra Niarchos (b. 5 July 1995)

Ancestry

Notes

References
 Mosley, Charles, Burke's Peerage and Baronetage, 107th edition, volume 2, page 1695.

1960 births
Living people
Niarchos family
Guinness family
Irish socialites